Grub can refer to Grub (larva), of the beetle superfamily Scarabaeoidea, or as a slang term for food. It can also refer to:

Places
 Grub, Appenzell Ausserrhoden, Switzerland
 Grub, St. Gallen, Switzerland
 Grub (Amerang), a hamlet in Bavaria, Germany
 Grub am Forst, a town in the district of Coburg in Bavaria, Germany
 Grub, Thuringia, a municipality in the district of Hildburghausen in Thuringia, Germany

Science and technology
 Headless set screw, a British term
 GNU GRUB, the GNU project's bootloader software
 Grub (search engine), a distributed search crawler platform

Other uses
The Grubs are Zurg's henchmen in Buzz Lightyear of Star Command
 Grub Street, the former name of a London street, which became a metonym for hack writers

See also
 Grubb
 Grubbs (disambiguation)